Brighton is a village located mostly in Macoupin County and partially in Jersey County, Illinois, United States. As of the 2020 census, the village had a population of 2,221. The village's current mayor is Matthew P. Kasten.

Brighton is a part of the Metro East region of the St. Louis Metropolitan Statistical Area.

History
Brighton is a small community that dates back to the early 19th century, when settlers began the transformation of the Illinois prairie into productive farmland. The village was named after Brighton, Massachusetts. A post office was opened in 1837, and the village was incorporated in 1869. Brighton is noted for its five-star historic museum.

Brighton currently has two restaurants and one traffic signal.

Geography
Brighton is located in southwestern Macoupin County and eastern Jersey County at  (39.039357, -90.139645). The village center and most of its area are within Macoupin County. Some rural residents of Madison County have Brighton mailing addresses.

Illinois Routes 111 and 267 pass jointly through the west side of the village, leading north  to Medora and south  to Godfrey.

Demographics

As of the census of 2010, there were 2,254 people. The racial makeup of the village was 98.41% White, 0.05% African American, 0.05% Native American, 0.46% Asian, 0.05% Pacific Islander, 0.14% from other races, and 0.87% from two or more races.  1.09% of the population were Hispanic or Latino of any race.

There were 816 households, of which 38.1% had children under the age of 18 living with them, 61.9% were married couples living together, 9.2% had a female householder with no husband present, and 25.4% were non-families. 22.5% of all households were made up of individuals, and 11.4% had someone living alone who was 65 years of age or older.  The average household size was 2.61 and the average family size was 3.06.

In the village, the age distribution of the population shows 26.6% under the age of 18, 8.4% from 18 to 24, 28.4% from 25 to 44, 22.1% from 45 to 64, and 14.5% who were 65 years of age or older.  The median age was 36 years.  For every 100 females, there were 93.5 males.  For every 100 females age 18 and over, there were 87.0 males.

The median income for a household in the village was $38,750, and the median income for a family was $43,167. Males had a median income of $37,150 versus $23,616 for females. The per capita income for the village was $16,453.  6.5% of the population and 6.8% of families were below the poverty line.  Of the total population, 7.7% of those under the age of 18 and 8.2% of those 65 and older were living below the poverty line.

Notable people

 Joe Bernard, pitcher for the St. Louis Cardinals
 Jason Isringhausen, pitcher for the New York Mets, St. Louis Cardinals, and Tampa Bay Rays
 Bushrod Johnson, Confederate general in the American Civil War

Notes
 Martha A. Bentley, There the Heart Is: A History of Brighton, Illinois, 1826–1964, was reprinted in 1995.
 Around the center of the village, there was an old American Civil War prisoner of war camp that was controlled by the Union.
 The opening scene of The Music Man (1962) is set in Brighton, purported to be one stop from River City, Iowa.
 Although the state is never explicitly said, a map within the show suggests that The Ghost and Molly McGee, a 2021 Disney Channel show, is set in Brighton.

References

External links

1869 establishments in Illinois
Metro East
Populated places established in 1869
Villages in Illinois
Villages in Jersey County, Illinois
Villages in Macoupin County, Illinois